The 2011  Women's Premier League was the tenth season of the Scottish Women's Premier League. A total of eleven teams contested the division. It was played as a double round-robin in 2011.

Celtic Reserves had won the 2010 Scottish Women's First Division, but were unable to be promoted as league rules stipulate each club may field only one team in the Premier League. Thus Hutchison Vale, as second-place finishers, were promoted and replaced the relegated Aberdeen. Dundee United Sports Club and Boroughmuir Thistle resigned from the league before the season commenced, resulting in Falkirk being offered promotion in February 2011.

On the 17th matchday, Glasgow City secured their fifth straight Scottish title. Spartans W.F.C. finished as runners-up.

Owing to a lack of clubs eligible to be promoted, F.C. Kilmarnock Ladies were spared relegation and competed in the Premier League in 2012.

Teams

Stadia and locations

The most regular home ground is shown though many clubs played matches at other venues throughout the season.

League standings 
FC Kilmarnock Ladies fielded an ineligible player in their 2–0 victory over Falkirk on 26 June 2011. The result was annulled and a 3–0 win awarded to Falkirk.

Statistics

Results

Top scorers

References

External links
Season on soccerway.com

1
2011 domestic association football leagues
Scottish Women's Premier League seasons